Viney is a female first name and surname, and may refer to:

Allan Viney, Australian politician
Doug Viney, New Zealand boxer and kickboxer
Jack Viney, Australian rules football player, son of Todd
Keith Viney, English soccer player
Matt Viney, Australian politician
Paul Viney, British auctioneer and valuer
Todd Viney, Australian rules football player, father of Jack
William M. Viney, American political organizer, a civil rights activist, and minister